Edsborgs IP is a football stadium in Trollhättan, and the home arena for FC Trollhättan. Edsborgs IP has a total capacity of 5,100 spectators.

External links 
 Fan-created 3D model of stadium

Football venues in Sweden